Senator Leach may refer to:

Daylin Leach (born 1961), Pennsylvania State Senate
Vince Leach (fl. 2010s), Arizona State Senate